Werner Schmieder (born 11 November 1926) is a former politician who served as the minister of finance in East Germany in the period 1980–1981.

Biography
Schmieder was born in Possendorf, today Bannewitz, on 11 November 1926. He received a degree in economy and in 1967 he also obtained PhD in road engineering. Between 1949 and 1955 he worked at Investbank in Dresden. In 1955 he became a member of the Socialist Unity Party. He was the head of the Investbank in Cottbus from 1955 to 1962. He served as the deputy minister of finance (1967–1974) and state secretary (1974–1980). 

Schmieder was appointed minister of finance in July 1980 succeeding Siegfried Böhm in the post. Schmieder's term ended in June 1981 when Ernst Höfner replaced him in the post.

References

External links

20th-century German politicians
1926 births
Finance ministers of East Germany
Living people
Members of the Central Committee of the Socialist Unity Party of Germany
Members of the Volkskammer
People of the Cold War
People from Sächsische Schweiz-Osterzgebirge